Viktor Andersson may refer to:
 Viktor Andersson (racing driver) (born 2003), Swedish racing driver
 Viktor Andersson (skier) (born 1992), Swedish freestyle skier
 Viktor Andersson (floorball) (born 1982), Swedish floorball player